José Ángel Crespo Rincón (born 9 February 1987) is a Spanish professional footballer who plays for Cypriot First Division club APOEL. Mainly a central defender, he also can play as a full-back.

He made 74 La Liga appearances for Sevilla, Racing Santander, Córdoba and Rayo Vallecano, and also had brief spells in Serie A with Bologna and the Premier League with Aston Villa. He won a Super League and four cups with Greece's PAOK.

Club career

Sevilla
Crespo was born in Lora del Río, Andalusia. A product of Sevilla FC's youth system, he made his first-team debut on 14 December 2005 in the group stage of the UEFA Cup, playing the full 90 minutes of a 1–1 draw at Bolton Wanderers; this was his only appearance of the team's victorious campaign. He made his La Liga bow a week later in a 1–0 away defeat against Getafe CF, appearing in two more games during the season while still registered with the reserves.

In the 2007–08 campaign, with Antonio Puerta's (who played mostly as left back) death, Crespo was definitely promoted to the main squad. In December 2008, Aston Villa reportedly showed interest in signing him after several good performances under coach Manolo Jiménez, also his coach at Sevilla Atlético.

On 3 July 2009, Crespo was loaned to fellow league club Racing de Santander in a season-long move. After appearing sparingly during his stint, with the Cantabrians narrowly avoiding relegation, he was released by Sevilla and joined Calcio Padova in Italy.

Bologna

Crespo moved to Bologna F.C. 1909 on 14 July 2011, alongside Padova teammates Federico Agliardi and Daniele Vantaggiato. Having been rarely played, he was loaned to Hellas Verona F.C. and Córdoba CF, signing a two-year permanent contract with the latter on 27 April 2015, with the deal being made effective in July.

During his spell with the Stadio Renato Dall'Ara-based side, Crespo made his debut in Serie A on 21 December 2011, playing the entire 0–2 home loss against A.S. Roma. He scored his first and only goal in the competition on 27 October 2013, to help the hosts defeat A.S. Livorno Calcio 1–0.

Aston Villa
On 27 July 2015, Aston Villa completed the signing of Crespo from Córdoba on a three-year deal for an undisclosed fee. He made his only appearance in the Premier League on 3 October, starting in a 0–1 home defeat to Stoke City.

Having made only one more appearance in the Football League Cup, Crespo joined Rayo Vallecano on 20 January 2016, on a six-month loan.

PAOK
In early July 2016, Crespo signed a three-year contract with PAOK FC, for a nominal fee. In one of his first games on 18 August, he scored in a 3–0 win at FC Dinamo Tbilisi to make the Europa League group stage. His first season in Thessaloniki ended with a Cup victory, as a 2–1 victory over AEK Athens F.C. ended 14 years of drought.

Crespo scored his first goal in the Super League Greece on 2 December 2017, in a 3–0 away win against Xanthi FC. The following campaign, PAOK won the double to end 35 years without a league title. A fourth cup conquest in 2021 made him the most successful player in the club's history.

Career statistics

Club

Honours
Sevilla B
Segunda División B: 2006–07

Sevilla
UEFA Cup: 2005–06

PAOK
Super League Greece: 2018–19
Greek Football Cup: 2016–17, 2017–18, 2018–19, 2020–21

Spain U19
UEFA European Under-19 Championship: 2006

References

External links

1987 births
Living people
People from Vega del Guadalquivir
Sportspeople from the Province of Seville
Spanish footballers
Footballers from Andalusia
Association football defenders
La Liga players
Segunda División players
Segunda División B players
Sevilla Atlético players
Sevilla FC players
Racing de Santander players
Córdoba CF players
Rayo Vallecano players
Serie A players
Serie B players
Calcio Padova players
Bologna F.C. 1909 players
Hellas Verona F.C. players
Premier League players
Aston Villa F.C. players
Super League Greece players
PAOK FC players
Cypriot First Division players
APOEL FC players
UEFA Cup winning players
Spain youth international footballers
Spain under-21 international footballers
Spanish expatriate footballers
Expatriate footballers in Italy
Expatriate footballers in England
Expatriate footballers in Greece
Expatriate footballers in Cyprus
Spanish expatriate sportspeople in Italy
Spanish expatriate sportspeople in England
Spanish expatriate sportspeople in Greece
Spanish expatriate sportspeople in Cyprus